The 1957 Argentine Primera División was the 66th season of top-flight football in Argentina. The season began on May 5 and ended on December 14.

River Plate achieved its 13th league title.

League standings

References

Argentine Primera División seasons
Argentine Primera Division
Primera Division